The Oratory School is an HMC co-educational private Roman Catholic boarding and day school for pupils aged 11–18 located in Woodcote,  north-west of Reading. Founded in 1859 by Saint John Henry Newman, The Oratory has historical ties to the Birmingham Oratory and the London Oratory School. Although a separate entity from the nearby Oratory Preparatory School, it shares a common history. Newman founded the school with the intention of providing boys with a Roman Catholic alternative to Eton College. Until 2020, when it first admitted girls, it was the only boys’ Roman Catholic public school left in the United Kingdom. According to the Good Schools Guide (last review: Oct 2021), the school is “an active choice for families looking for a small, nurturing environment... Parents tell us - ‘it’s like a new school'; ‘we all want to be on board... With excellent leadership and now girls on board, too, The Oratory seems to be thriving."

The Oratory has received the highest grade of 'Excellent' for both Independent Schools Inspectorate (ISI Report: Nov 2021) categories: pupils’ academic & other achievements and pupils’ personal development.

History 

The Oratory School was founded in 1859. The first boys arrived before work began on 1 May that year. The objective was to provide a Roman Catholic alternative to other schools, particularly for the sons of converts from Anglicanism who considered existing Catholic schools culturally and socially inferior.

The school was originally located in Edgbaston, Birmingham, attached to the Birmingham Oratory Fathers' House and the Oratory Church. In 1923, under pressure for additional space, it moved to Caversham Park, a Victorian stately home near Reading. Following the outbreak of the Second World War, that property was requisitioned by the government, initially with the intention of being used as a hospital, but in the event being purchased in 1941 by the BBC as a base for its Monitoring Service. The school acquired a new site not far away in Woodcote, where it has remained ever since. According to a Freedom of Information Request the school withdrew from the Teachers Pension Scheme on the 31st December 2020.

Music and The Schola Cantorum

The school has an orchestral and choral tradition, with former choristers of Westminster Cathedral among the pupils. The school's professional youth choir, known as the 'Schola Cantorum', has over 40 pupils and demands high performance calibre and therefore standard auditions and requirements. They have performed at venues such as Windsor Castle and for the Pope, as well as frequent public performances around the country, most commonly London, most recently Nelson's mass and Zadok the Priest in Hyde Park. Several choristers have recently joined the National Youth Choir of Great Britain.

Real Tennis
The Oratory is one of four schools in the United Kingdom with a real tennis court (others being Radley, Canford, and Wellington College) and plays this sport, hosting championships and international tournaments. It was the first location in the United Kingdom to construct a Real Tennis court for 80 years, finishing the building in 1990.

Over recent years the UK Professional Singles Tournament has been held at the court, and in April 2006 the World Championships were held there in which world no. 1 Robert Fahey (Australia) beat USA player Tim Chisholm. In January 2020 the World Championship Eliminator match took place between Camden Riviere and Old Oratorian, Nicky Howell. Camden Riviere went on to play the current Real World Tennis World Champion, Robert Fahey in the Final Eliminator in Boston in February 2020.

In September 2020, The Oratory School welcomed Claire Fahey, reigning Women's Real Tennis Champion as its Head of Racquets and Games Coach. Robert Fahey is Head Professional of The Oratory School Real Tennis Club (ORTC). Together Team Fahey represents the most successful partnership in history winning almost 100 open titles between them.

Notable head masters
The current head master, Joe Smith is a member of the Headmasters' and Headmistresses' Conference.

1862–1865 Tom Arnold
1867–1868 Gerard Manley Hopkins
1910–1921 Edward Pereira
1933–1939 Illtyd Trethowan
1953–1967 Adrian Morey
2000–2014 Clive Dytor

Controversy

Sexual abuse

In February 2013, it was discovered that Jonathan O'Brien, a former teacher, had been involved in sexually abusing boys aged ten to sixteen while working at The Oratory in the 1980s. O'Brien was sentenced to thirteen years imprisonment.

Disciplinary

In February 2014, there were allegations that older pupils had been beating younger students and killing animals outside school - including the skinning of a cat. A teacher resigned and alleged that she had done so because her concerns over the pupils' behaviour had been repeatedly ignored. She then filed a claim against the school for "forced dismissal" but the claim was thrown out by the Reading employment tribunal as she had voluntarily resigned and was not "forced to quit". The then-headmaster Clive Dytor stated that the incidents she mentioned had already been dealt with.

Notable alumni

Former pupils include Hilaire Belloc, Christopher Tolkien, Michael Tolkien, Sir Adrian Carton de Wiart,  tenor Gervase Elwes, war artist Simon Elwes, Igor Judge, Michael Berkeley, rugby union players Danny Cipriani and Ayoola Erinle, Olympic gold medallist John Pius Boland, English cricketer Benny Howell, actor Jonathan Bailey, Made in Chelsea stars Francis Boulle & Frederik Ferrier, and Portuguese royal Afonso, Prince of Beira.

See also
The Oratory Preparatory School
List of rowing blades by school and university

References

Further reading

External links

 The Oratory School website
 Profile on the Independent Schools Council website

Boys' schools in Oxfordshire
Boarding schools in Oxfordshire
Educational institutions established in 1859
Oratory of Saint Philip Neri
Roman Catholic private schools in the Archdiocese of Birmingham
Private schools in Oxfordshire
Catholic boarding schools in England
1859 establishments in England
Member schools of the Headmasters' and Headmistresses' Conference
Real tennis venues